Asperula ambleia is a deciduous species of perennial groundcover, and a flowering plant in the family Rubiaceae, known as Stiff Woodruff, and is endemic from SE. Queensland to NE. Victoria in Australia, and was first named by Airy Shaw.

Description
Asperula ambleia appears as a long green heather-like plant, with small (1in) white flowers, on long, rough, woody stems, it has compact, green, needle-like leaves.

Growth cycle
Asperula ambleia flowers around May-June, and grows best in a rock garden, trough or crevice.

References

ambleia